The 2014 Georgia State Panthers baseball team represented Georgia State University in the 2014 NCAA Division I baseball season.  The Panthers played their home games at the GSU Baseball Complex. 2014 represents the first year of GSU playing back in the Sun Belt Conference. The Panthers finished the season with a 25-31, going 11-19 in the Sun Belt Conference, going 19-14 at home vs 6-17 away. The Panthers finished 9th in the Sun Belt.

Personnel

2014 Roster

Coaching Staff

Schedule

! style="background:#0000FF;color:white;"| Regular Season
|- valign="top" 

|- bgcolor="#ccffcc"
| 1 || February 14 ||  || GSU Baseball Complex || 5-4 || 1-0 || -
|- align="center" bgcolor="#ffccc"
| 2 || February 15 || Illinois || GSU Baseball Complex || 13-19 || 1-1 || -
|- bgcolor="#ccffcc"
| 3 || February 16 || Illinois || GSU Baseball Complex || 10-6 || 2-1 || -
|- bgcolor="#ccffcc"
| 4 || February 18 ||  || Savannah, GA || 7-6 || 3-1 || -
|- align="center" bgcolor="#ffccc"
| 5 || February 21 || Ole Miss || Oxford, MS || 0-3 || 3-2 || -
|- align="center" bgcolor="#ffccc"
| 6 || February 22 || Ole Miss || Oxford, MS || 1-9 || 3-3 || -
|- bgcolor="#ccffcc"
| 7 || February 23 || Ole Miss || Oxford, MS || 6-4 || 4-3 || -
|- bgcolor="#ccffcc"
| 8 || February 26 ||  || Athens, GA || 3-2 || 5-3 || -
|- align="center" bgcolor="#ffccc"
| 9 || February 28 ||  || GSU Baseball Complex || 5-6 || 5-4 || -
|-

|- align="center" bgcolor="#ffccc"
| 10 || March 1 || Northern Kentucky || GSU Sports Arena || 3-4 || 5-5 || -
|- bgcolor="#ccffcc"
| 11 || March 2 || Northern Kentucky || GSU Sports Arena || 13-2 || 6-5 || -
|- align="center" bgcolor="#ffccc"
| 12 || March 4 ||  || Kennesaw, GA || 0-3 || 6-6 || -
|- align="center" bgcolor="#ffccc"
| 13 || March 7 ||  || GSU Baseball Complex || 1-16 || 6-7 || -
|- align="center" bgcolor="#ffccc"
| 14 || March 8 || Xavier || GSU Baseball Complex || 10-11 || 6-8 || -
|- bgcolor="#ccffcc"
| 15 || March 9 || Xavier || GSU Baseball Complex || 7-6 || 7-8 || -
|- bgcolor="#ccffcc"
| 16 || March 11 ||  || GSU Baseball Complex || 15-9 || 8-8 || -
|- bgcolor="#ccffcc"
| 17 || March 12 || Siena || GSU Baseball Complex || 19-5 || 9-8 || -
|- bgcolor="#ccffcc"
| 18 || March 14 ||  || GSU Baseball Complex || 6-5 || 10-8 || 1-0
|- align="center" bgcolor="#ffccc"
| 19 || March 15 || Western Kentucky || GSU Baseball Complex || 3-4 || 10-9 || 1-1
|- align="center" bgcolor="#ffccc"
| 20 || March 15 || Western Kentucky || GSU Baseball Complex || 5-6 || 10-10 || 1-2
|- align="center" bgcolor="#ffccc"
| 21 || March 19 ||  || GSU Baseball Complex || 4-9 || 10-11 || 1-2
|- align="center" bgcolor="#ffccc"
| 22 || March 21 || #5 Louisiana–Lafayette || Lafayette, LA || 3-8 || 10-11 || 1-3
|- align="center" bgcolor="#ffccc"
| 23 || March 22 || Louisiana–Lafayette || Lafayette, LA || 6-14 || 10-13 || 1-4
|- align="center" bgcolor="#ffccc"
| 24 || March 23 || Louisiana–Lafayette || Lafayette, LA || 3-5 || 10-14 || 1-5
|- bgcolor="#ccffcc"
| 25 || March 25 ||  || GSU Baseball Complex || 19-3 || 11-14 || 1-5
|- bgcolor="#ccffcc"
| 26 || March 26 || Alabama A&M || GSU Baseball Complex || 19-6 || 12-14 || 1-5
|- bgcolor="#ccffcc"
| 27 || March 28 ||  || GSU Baseball Complex || 8-6 || 13-14 || 2-5
|- bgcolor="#ccffcc"
| 28 || March 29 || Troy || GSU Baseball Complex || 6-3 || 14-14 || 3-5
|- align="center" bgcolor="#ffccc"
| 29 || March 30 || Troy || GSU Baseball Complex || 9-13 || 14-15 || 3-6
|-

|- align="center" bgcolor="#ffccc"
| 30 || April 2 || Georgia Tech || Atlanta, GA || 3-7 || 14-16 || 3-6
|- align="center" bgcolor="#ffccc"
| 31 || April 4 ||  || Little Rock, AR || 7-14 || 14-17 || 3-7
|- bgcolor="#ccffcc"
| 32 || April 5 || Arkansas–Little Rock || Little Rock, AR || 3-2 || 15-17 || 4-7
|- align="center" bgcolor="#ffccc"
| 33 || April 6 || Arkansas–Little Rock || Little Rock, AR || 2-9 || 15-18 || 4-8
|- bgcolor="#ccffcc"
| 34 || April 9 ||  || GSU Baseball Complex || 8-7 || 16-18 || 4-8
|- bgcolor="#ccffcc"
| 35 || April 11 ||  || GSU Baseball Complex || 11-10 || 17-18 || 5-8
|- align="center" bgcolor="#ffccc"
| 36 || April 12 || Texas–Arlington || GSU Baseball Complex || 3-6 || 17-19 || 5-9
|- align="center" bgcolor="#ffccc"
| 37 || April 13 || Texas–Arlington || GSU Baseball Complex || 4-6 || 17-20 || 5-10
|- align="center" bgcolor="#fffff"
| - || April 15 || Kennesaw State || GSU Baseball Complex || Cancelled || - || -
|- align="center" bgcolor="#ffccc"
| 38 || April 18 || Texas State || San Marcos, TX || 1-8 ||17-21 || 5-11
|- align="center" bgcolor="#ffccc"
| 39 || April 19 || Texas State || San Marcos || 2-4 || 17-22 || 5-12
|- align="center" bgcolor="#ffccc"
| 40 || April 20 || Texas State || San Marcos || 1-4 || 17-23 || 5-13
|- bgcolor="#ccffcc"
| 41 || April 22 ||  || GSU Baseball Complex || 18-2 || 18-23 || 5-13
|- bgcolor="#ccffcc"
| 42 || April 23 || Savannah State || GSU Baseball Complex || 12-6 || 19-23 || 5-13
|- bgcolor="#ccffcc"
| 43 || April 25 ||  || GSU Baseball Complex || 5-1 || 20-23 || 6-13
|- bgcolor="#ccffcc"
| 44 || April 26 || Arkansas State || GSU Baseball Complex || 7-6 || 21-23 || 7-13
|- align="center" bgcolor="#ffccc"
| 45 || April 27 || Arkansas State || GSU Baseball Complex || 6-10 || 21-24 || 7-14
|-

|- align="center" bgcolor="#ffccc"
| 46 || May 2 ||  || GSU Baseball Complex || 1-8 || 21-25 || 7-15
|- bgcolor="#ccffcc"
| 47 || May 3 || South Alabama || GSU Baseball Complex || 7-4 || 22-25 || 8-15
|- bgcolor="#ccffcc"
| 48 || May 4 || South Alabama || GSU Baseball Complex || 15-10 || 23-25 || 9-15
|- align="center" bgcolor="#ffccc"
| 49 || May 7 || Kennesaw State || GSU Baseball Complex || 6-11 || 23-26 || 9-15
|- bgcolor="#ccffcc"
| 50 || May 9 || Louisiana–Monroe || Monroe, LA || 6-5 || 24-26 || 10-15
|- align="center" bgcolor="#ffccc"
| 51 || May 10 || Louisiana–Monroe || Monroe, LA || 6-10 || 24-27 || 10-16
|- align="center" bgcolor="#ffccc"
| 52 || May 11 || Louisiana–Monroe || Monroe, LA || 1-11 || 24-28 || 10-17
|- align="center" bgcolor="#ffccc"
| 53 || May 13 || Mercer || Macon, GA || 5-6 ||24-29 || 10-17
|- align="center" bgcolor="#ffccc"
| 54 || May 15 || Western Kentucky || Bowling Green, KY || 1-10 || 24-30 || 10-18
|- align="center" bgcolor="#ffccc"
| 55 || May 16 || Western Kentucky || Bowling Green, KY || 1-2 || 24-31 || 10-19
|- bgcolor="#ccffcc"
| 56 || May 17 || Western Kentucky || Bowling Green, KY || 5-4 || 25-31 || 11-19
|-

|-
! style="background:#0000FF;color:white;"| Post-Season
|- 

|- bgcolor="#ffffff"
| 57 || NA || Did not qualify || Mobile, AL || - || - || - || -
|-

|-
|

References

Georgia State
Georgia State Panthers baseball seasons